Gary Alexander is an American martial artist, karate fighter, author and actor. He was Black Belt Magazine's Co-Instructor of the Year (1974) and is known as the "First International Bare Knuckle Contact Karate Champion.

On November 17, 1962, Gary Alexander won the first Canadian Karate Championship sponsored by Mas Tsuruoka.    On November 24, 1962, Gary Alexander won the North American Championship sponsored by Mas Oyama, which was held at the Madison Square Garden.  Both events were bare knuckle full contact, whereas the winner was the fighter still standing.

Alexander is a member of the Black Belt Magazine's Hall of Fame, Action Martial Arts Hall of Fame, World Karate Union Hall of Fame, and the Australasian Martial Arts Hall of Fame.

Gary Alexander is a marine veteran who served in the Pacific with Weapons Company, First Battalion, Fighting Ninth Marines, Fleet Marine Force, and has acted in films and on television, specifically Gideon Oliver with Lou Gossett, Jr. for Universal Pictures, and Avenging Force with Michael Dudikoff for Cannon Pictures.

He is also the producer and star of a series of twenty martial arts instructional videos and is also the author of "Unarmed and Dangerous, Hand to Hand Combat and Defense Systems".

References

Living people
American male karateka
United States Marines
Year of birth missing (living people)
20th-century American people